Noah Zavolas (born May 11, 1996) is an American professional baseball pitcher for the Milwaukee Brewers organization.

Amateur career 
Zavolas attended Acton-Boxborough Regional High School in Acton, Massachusetts. He enrolled at Harvard University and played college baseball for the Harvard Crimson. During the summer of 2017, Zavolas pitched for the Wareham Gatemen of the Cape Cod Baseball League.

Professional career 
The Seattle Mariners selected Zavolas in the 18th round of the 2018 MLB draft. He made his professional debut that year with the Modesto Nuts and was promoted to the Everett AquaSox during the season. In 19 relief appearances between the two clubs, he went 5–2 with a 3.03 ERA and a 1.09 WHIP. After the 2018 season, the Mariners traded Zavolas and Ben Gamel to the Milwaukee Brewers for Domingo Santana.

Zavolas spent 2019 with the Carolina Mudcats, going 6–5 with a 2.98 ERA over 22 starts, striking out 102 over 133 innings. He did not play a minor league game in 2020 due to the cancellation of the minor league season caused by the COVID-19 pandemic. He spent the 2021 season with the Biloxi Shuckers, starting 22 games and going 5–7 with a 4.40 ERA. He started the 2022 season with the Biloxi Shuckers.

References

External links 

Wareham Gatemen players
1996 births
Living people
Harvard Crimson baseball players
Sportspeople from Beverly, Massachusetts
Modesto Nuts players
Milwaukee Brewers players
Major League Baseball pitchers